Muḥammad al-Bāqir, with the full name Muḥammad ibn ʿAlī ibn al-Ḥusayn ibn ʿAlī ibn Abī Ṭālib, also known as Abū Jaʿfar or simply al-Bāqir (c. 676 c. 732) was the fifth Imam in Shia Islam, succeeding his father, Zayn al-Abidin, and succeeded by his son, Ja'far al-Sadiq. His mother, Fatima Umm Abd Allah, was the daughter of Hasan, making al-Baqir the first Imam who descended from both grandsons of Muhammad, namely, Hasan and Husayn. 

Al-Baqir was born in Medina, about the time when Mu'awiya I was working to secure the succession of his son, Yazid. As a child, al-Baqir witnessed the tragedy of Karbala, in which all of his male relatives were massacred, except his father who was too ill to participate in the fighting. As a young man, al-Baqir witnessed the power struggles between the Umayyads, Abd Allah ibn al-Zubayr, and various Shia groups, while his father resigned from political activities.

Al-Baqir is revered by both Shia and Sunni Muslims as an eminent expert in jurisprudence, the exegesis of the Quran, the science of hadith, and theology. Though he was a resident of Medina, his main following was in Kufa, Iraq, where he attracted a number of distinguished theologians. Al-Baqir is credited with laying the foundations of Twelver Shia, including a coherent theory of imamate, which was further developed by his son and successor, Jafar al-Sadiq. Like his father, al-Baqir adopted a policy of quiescence, and reportedly attempted to dissuade his half-brother, Zayd, from prematurely revolting against the Umayyads. 

According to Tabatabai, al-Baqir was poisoned by Ibrahim ibn al-Walld, during his brief reign. Though 114 AH (732) and 117 (735) are commonly reported, there are different views about the date and cause of al-Baqir's death.

Ancestry 
Al-Baqir descended from a prominent  lineage. His father was Ali ibn Husayn, known also by the honorific title Zayn al-Abidin, and his paternal grandfather was Husayn, while his mother was Fatima Umm Abd Allah, and his maternal grandfather was Hasan. His grandfathers, Hasan and Husayn, were the two eldest surviving sons of Ali through his first wife, Fatima, daughter of the Islamic prophet, Muhammad.

Name
The honorific title al-Baqir is an abbreviation of Baqir al-'ilm, which means either 'the one who splits knowledge open' (brings it to light) or 'the one who possesses great knowledge'. According to Ibn Khallikan, Muhammad ibn Ali received the honorific title al-Baqir because of the ample fund of knowledge he possessed. Ya'qubi, however, writes that al-Baqir received this title because he split knowledge open by scrutinizing and examining its depths. In Shia belief, al-Baqir's title was designated by the Islamic prophet, Muhammad. The Shia al-Kulayni writes that the prophet's only surviving companion, Jabir ibn Abd Allah, commonly addressed Muhammad ibn Ali as "O Baqir al-'ilm," telling the Medinan residents about Muhammad's prophesy, "O Jabir! You will meet a man from my family who will have the same name and the same characteristics as mine. He will split open knowledge extensively." According to al-Kulayni, Jabir first met Muhammad ibn Ali when the latter was still a child and identified him from the prophet's description. After confirming his identity, Jabir approached Muhammad ibn Ali, kissed his forehead and gave the prophet's regards.

Zayd replied that it was the prophet Muhammad who had given his brother the title al-Baqir and then reprimanded Hisham for opposing the prophet. This narration suggests, according to Lalani, that al-Baqir was known by this title before he was born.

Biography
Al-Baqir was born in Medina about 56 AH (676 AD), around the time Muawiyah I was working to secure the caliphate of his son, Yazid I. When al-Baqir was a three or four years old, his family suffered the tragedy of Karbala, where his grandfather, Husayn, was killed by the forces of Yazid, alongside many of his relatives and supporters. In particular, al-Yaqubi maintains that al-Baqir was also present at Karbala. In his youth, al-Baqir witnessed the struggle for power between the Umayyads, Abd Allah ibn al-Zubayr, and various Shia groups, while his father, Zayn al-Abidin, remained politically quiescent. Al-Baqir became Imam upon the death of his father in 94 or 95 AH and he too adopted a quiescent approach but was nevertheless harassed by the Umayyad rulers, as Kohlberg writes. Al-Baqir, however, enjoyed certain liberties as the Umayyads were busy infighting and quelling revolts, according to Tabatabai. He became the focus of growing Shia loyalties as many Kufan Shia delegations visited him in Medina to attend his teaching circle and ask questions.

Abd al-Malik's reign (685-705 CE) 
Abd al-Malik ibn Marwan, the fifth Umayyad caliph, is said to have issued an Islamic gold coinage for the first time, replacing the Byzantine coins, at the suggestion of al-Baqir. Sharif al-Qarashi writes that Abd al-Malik consulted Muhammad al-Baqir about the threatening letters he had received from the Byzantine emperor after Abd al-Malik forbade the Christian motto (Father, Son, and the Holy Spirit) across Muslim territories. In response, the Byzantine emperor threatened Abd al-Malik with engraving insulting words to Muhammad on the Byzantine coins. When Abd al-Malik consulted al-Baqir about this, the latter proposed issuing Islamic coinage to replace the Byzantine denarius.

Umar II's reign (717-720 CE) 
Umar II is often considered the most pious Umayyad ruler. He is said to have been favourably disposed to al-Baqir and, after meeting with him, even returned Fadak to the Alids. 

According to Kohlberg, in a narration apparently propagated by the anti-Alids and recorded by Ibn Sa'd, al-Baqir identified Umar II as the Mahdi, the promised saviour in Islam. According to a Shia source, however, al-Baqir prophesied that Umar will be caliph, will do his best to spread justice, and will be honoured by the inhabitants of the earth upon his death but cursed by the inhabitants of heaven because he had usurped Imam's right to the caliphate.

Hisham's reign (724-743 CE) 
Hisham ibn Abd al-Malik summoned al-Baqir to Damascus several times and held him in prison at least once, according to Kohlberg. Al-Baqir was then sent back to Medina with escorts who were ordered not to give him any food or water. Possibly on another occasion, according to Momen, Hisham summoned al-Baqir and his son, Jafar, to Damascus and was defeated by him in a debate about whether Ali possessed knowledge of unseen.

Death

Though 114 AH (732) and 117 (735) are commonly reported, there is considerable disagreement about the date of al-Baqir's death, ranging from 114 AH (732) to 118 (736).

As with the other Imams, al-Baqir is regarded as a martyr in Shia belief, though there are different views about the manner of his death. According to one account, al-Baqir was poisoned by Caliph Hisham ibn Abd al-Malik, while some accounts say that al-Baqir died during the rein of Hisham's successor, al-Walid II, or was poisoned by Ibrahim ibn al-Walld in his brief reign, which is also the view held by Tabatabai. In yet another account, al-Baqir was poisoned by his cousin, Zaid ibn al-Hasan, who placed poison in the saddle on which al-Baqir sat when he failed to wrest control of the prophet's inheritance from al-Baqir. Al-Baqir was laid to rest in al-Baqi' cemetery in Medina.

Imamate

According to Jafri, it is widely reported that Zayn al-Abidin designated his eldest son, Muhammad al-Baqir, as the next Imam before his death. Lalani adds that this view is held by the Twelver and Isma'ili Shia sects. The traditions reported by the Twelver al-Kulayni suggest that al-Baqir received the weapons and books of the prophet from his father in presence of his brothers, thus symbolizing authority. In that period, various branches of the Kaysanites were also popular. They traced the imamate through Muhammad ibn al-Hanafiyyah, a non-Fatimid son of Ali. Al-Baqir's descent from Fatima, Muhammad's only surviving daughter, gave him a clear advantage over non-Fatimid claimants to the imamate.

Zayd, a half-brother of al-Baqir, also asserted a claim to the imamate, saying that the title can belong to any descendant of Hasan or Husayn who is learned, pious, and revolts against the tyrants of his time. In this, Zayd was possibly influenced by the teachings of the Mutazilite Wasil ibn Ata, though the Twelver author Shareef al-Qurashi writes that Zayd was primarily educated by his father, Zayn al-Abidin. Al-Shahrastani recounts an argument between the two brothers, in which Zayd remarked that an imam must rise against oppressors, while al-Baqir reminded him that his own father, the fourth Shia Imam, never fought to assert his claims to the imamate. Zayd also accommodated to some extent the view point of the majority of Muslims by acknowledging the caliphates of Abu Bakr and Umar and accepting their legal practices, though he still regarded Ali as the best candidate. Initially, Zayd's activist approach gained him a large following. However, as he increasingly compromised with the traditionalists, some of Zayd's supporters are said to have returned to Muhammad al-Baqir. Eventually, Zayd took up arms against the Umayyads in 122 AH and was killed in Kufa by the forces of Caliph Hisham. Al-Baqir is reported to have advised Zayd against a premature revolt and even prophesied that he would be slain. After his death, a number of other revolts are also attributed to the Zaydi movement, continuing to modern times. The influence of al-Baqir in Zaydi doctrines has been described as significant by multiple authors.

In contrast to Zayd, al-Baqir opted for a policy of quiescence like his father and his theory of imamate was hereditary through divine designation, independent of outward political functions. Instead, according to Lalani, it was al-Baqir's extensive knowledge, his noble birth, primogeniture and personality which gained al-Baqir his following. Al-Baqir also enjoyed certain liberties as the Umayyads were busy infighting and quelling revolts, according to Tabatabai. He became the focus of growing Shia loyalties as many Kufan Shia delegations visited him in Medina to attend his teaching circle and ask questions. Al-Baqir is credited with laying the foundations of the Twelver Shia, and his imamate marks the transition of the Shia to completely rely on the guidance of their Imams and reject the rulings upon which the rest of Muslims depended. The numerous traditions attributed to al-Baqir and his many distinguished disciples, according to Tabatabai, attest to the opportunities for disseminating the Shia thought which did not exist before al-Baqir.

Al-Baqir also sought to curb the influence of the Ghulat, followers who often conferred divinity on the Shia Imams and exaggerated their beliefs and personalities. Among them was Mughira ibn sa'id al-Bajali, the founder of the sect Mughiriyya, who held al-Baqir as divine and was rejected by him. Another example was Bayan ibn sam'an who reportedly asked al-Baqir to recognize him as prophet and Imam. Al-Baqir also disassociated himself from Abu al-Khattab, the founder of a Ghulat sect in Kufa, and his followers.

Miracles
Some miracles are attributed to al-Baqir. He is reported to have conversed with animals, returned sight to the blind, and foretold future events, such as the death in the battle of his brother, Zayd, defeat of the Umaayads and the accession of the Abbasid Caliph, al-Mansur.

Succession
Al-Baqir was succeeded by his eldest son, Jafar al-Sadiq. According to a polemic Sunni source, the Shia sect al-Bakiriyya did not accept al-Baqir's death and awaited his return as Mahdi, the promised saviour in Islam.

Teachings
While politically quiescent, al-Baqir is said to have played a significant role in the history of Islam from an intellectual and religious point of view, as attested to by the vast number of traditions ascribed to al-Baqir. As the first Shia Imam who engaged in systematic teaching, Lalani regards al-Baqir as a versatile expert in jurisprudence, the exegesis of the Quran, the science of hadith, and theology. Al-Baqir has also been credited with laying the doctrinal and legal foundations of the Twelver Shia, which were further developed by al-Baqir's son, Jafar al-Sadiq. The evidence also suggests that al-Baqir was a prominent traditionalist, distinct in that he only accepted those traditions of Muhammad which had been reported by the previous Imams.

The many splinter groups within the Shia movement likely motivated al-Baqir to bring some order to the existing concepts of imamate by laying out a more coherent theory based on the Quran and the hadith literature. A key principle of al-Baqir's theory is that the imamate passes on from one Imam to the next through divinely-inspired designation, beginning with Muhammad who also listed all the Imams. Al-Baqir also explained the necessary qualities and attributes of an Imam, such as his esoteric knowledge and infallibility, which distinguished the Imam from others as the best of mankind, the representative of God on earth, and the rightful interpreter of His words in the Quran. The Imams also hold absolute spiritual authority, resting on the absolute authority of Muhammad. As the sole spiritual guide in life and the source of intercession in the afterlife, the authority of Imam in al-Baqir's view did not rest on outward political power. Al-Baqir also defended the doctrine of dissociation from the first three caliphs, whom the Shia considers as usurpers, and the majority of Muhammad's companions, as the enemies of the Imams.

Al-Baqir founded what later developed into the Twelver school of law and consolidated the characteristic practices of the Shia. For instance, he reinstated the expression  in the Shia call to prayer, which was allegedly removed by Umar according to Shia and some early Sunni sources. Another distinct ruling was that wiping one's footwear before prayer, though common, was unacceptable as a substitute for washing one's feet. Al-Baqir also defended  marriage as a practice sanctioned by Muhammad. Al-Baqir forbade all intoxicants, whereas the Kufan jurists permitted fermented drinks. Al-Baqir also maintained that, under the threat of death or injury, self-protection through dissimulation is necessary.

Al-Baqir is closely associated with Twelver exegesis of the Quran and is credited with the commentary Kitab al-Baqir, parts of which are extant in Tafsir by Ali ibn Ibrahim al-Qomi. Tafsir Jabir al-Jufi is a collection of exegetical traditions ascribed to al-Baqir and narrated by Jabir ibn Yazid al-Jufi. In Tafsir Nur al-Thaqalayn, an extensive Shia exegesis of the Quran, al-Baqir is the authority for 13 percent of the traditions, behind only Muhammad (13.5 percent) and al-Sadiq (47 percent). Al-Baqir also contributed to the theological doctrines about iman, qada wa qadar, the unity of God, and other hotly debated topics in the broader Muslim community. 

According to al-Kafi, al-Baqir held that everyone was accountable on the day of judgement to the extent of their intelligence.

Notable disciples 
Al-Baqir is known as the first Shia Imam who engaged in the systematic teaching of the Shia beliefs. Though he lived in Medina, the main following of al-Baqir was in Kufa, where he attracted a number of distinguished theologians.

Kufa 
 Jabir ibn Yazid al-Ju'fi was the main representative of al-Baqir in Kufa. As an authority in hadith, he has been described as truthful and with the quality of reliability but quoted by unreliable transmitters. Jabir is the transmitter of some hadiths in Umm al-Kitab and he is also the main narrator of al-Baqir in Risalat al-Ju'fi.
 Aban ibn Taghlib was an outstanding jurist-traditionalist and an associate of al-Baqir, but also of Zayn al-Abidin and al-Sadiq. Al-Baqir is reported to have praised Aban as, "Sit in the mosque of Kufa and give legal judgement to the people. Indeed I would like to see among my Shia, people like you."
 Zurarah ibn A'yan was a disciple of al-Hakam ibn Utayba before joining al-Baqir. A prominent traditionalist and theologian, Zurarah played an important role in the development of the Shia thought. Zurarah lived long enough to also become a close disciple of Jafar al-Sadiq.
 Burayd ibn Mu'awieh Ejli was a famous disciple of al-Baqir and later al-Sadiq, who later became a key authority in the Shia jurisprudence. Al-Baqir praised him (along with Abu Basir Moradi, Muhammad bin Muslim, and Zurarah) as worthy of the paradise.
 Abu Basir al-Asadi was considered one of the poles of the intellectual leadership of the Imami community of Kufa. His name is included in the number of six companions of al-Baqir and al-Sadiq that hadiths narrated by any one of them is considered authentic by many Shi'a scholars. Some consider Abu Basir al-Moradi as one of those six people instead of Abu Basir al-Asadi.
 Abu Basir Moradi, a famous Shia jurist and traditionalist, was another associate of al-Baqir and al-Sadiq. Al-Sadiq is believed to have told Moradi, Zurarah, Burayd, and Muhammad ibn Muslim that without them the prophetic hadiths would have been lost.
 Abu Hamza al-Thumali and Abu Khalid Kameli, formerly disciples of Zayn al-Abedin, were also among al-Baqir's followers. Abu Hamza al-Thumali is regarded as a trustworthy transmitter of hadith, especially those about miracles.
 Fudayl ibn Yasar is another notable associate of both al-Baqir and al-Sadiq, about whom al-Sadiq said what Muhammad had said about Salman the Persian, that "Fudayl is from us, the Ahl al-Bayt."
 Al-Kumayt ibn Zayd al-Asadi was a renowned poet of his time and a devout Shia of al-Baqir. His Hashimiyyat, in praise of the Ahl al-Bayt, is considered among the earliest evidence for the doctrine of imamate.
 Abu Jafar Muhammad ibn Ali ibn Nu'man known as Mu'min al-Taq was a distinguished theologist and a devoted follower of al-Baqir and al-Sadiq, whose debates about imamate are famous. Kitab al-Imamah and Kitab al_Radd alla al-Mu'tazila fi Imamat al-Mafdul are among his works.

Elsewhere 
Basra was generally not considered a Shia city though al-Baqir had a few notable disciples there as well, including Muhammad ibn Marwan al-Basri, Isma'il ibn Fadl al-Hashemi, Malek ibn A'yan al-Juhani. The last one should not be confused with Zurara's brother. Al-Baqir's circle in Mecca included Ma'ruf ibn Kharbuz Makki, a famed jurist and traditionalist, though not comparable to Zurarah, and Maymun ibn al-Aswad al-Qaddah, who was likely a merchant and in charge of the Imam's property in Mecca. One of his sons, Abdullah, later became the alleged ancestor of the Isma'ili imams. Elsewhere, prominent followers of al-Baqir include Muhammad ibn Isma'il Bazi and other members of Bazi's family, Abu Harun and his namesake, Abu Harun Makfuf, Uqba ibn Bashir al-Asadi, Aslam al-Makki, and Najiyy ibn Abi Mu'adh ibn Muslim.

Works

A number of works are ascribed to al-Baqir. An indication of the breadth of his contributions, Musnad al-Imam al-Baqir is a six-volume book attributed to al-Baqir, consisting of Twelver law and doctrines. It was collected by Azizallah al-Utaridi, who compiled it mostly from Twelver Shia sources, but also from Ismaili, Zaydi, and Sunni references.
The book covers legal issues such as divorce, manumission, testimony, inheritance, funerals, and marriage, ritual practices such as supplications, ritual purity, prayer, fasting, alms, and pilgrimage, and doctrinal issues such as monotheism, imamate, faith, and unbelief. A synopsis of al-Baqir's teachings, collected in Ma'athirul-Baqir, appears in Cannon Sell's Ithna Ashariyya.

Tafsir al-Baqir or Ketab al-Baqir is an exegesis of the Quran attributed to al-Baqir and transmitted by his disciple, Abu l-Jarud Ziyad ibn al-Mundhir. Ranked first by Najashi among the early Quranic commentaries, this work is partially extant in Tafsir by Ali ibn Ibrahim al-Qomi. Another Quranic commentary ascribed to al-Bāqir is narrated by Jabir ibn Yazid al-Ju'fi and compiled by Rasul Kaẓim Abd al-Sada under the title Tafsir Jabir al-Juʿfī. Risalat al-Ju'fi contains views about the Ismaili sect and is narrated mainly by Jabir ibn Yazid al-Ju'fi, a companion of al-Baqir. Al-Manasik is a treatise on the rituals of Islamic pilgrimage that Abu l-Jarud Ziyad ibn al-Mundhir quoted from al-Baqir. Al-Manasik is quoted in full in an extant work by Ahmad ibn Isa.

Umm al-Kitab is said to contain al-Baqir's answers to some of the questions posed by his followers, Jabir ibn Yazid al-Ju'fi and is in the form of a discussion between the Imam and three of his companions. Some of the traditions in the book are transmitted by Jabir ibn Yazid al-Ju'fi and in its 'Apocalypse of Jabir', al-Baqir confides to Jabir how the cosmos were created, how men descended to this world, and how they can gain deliverance from it. According to Kohlberg, Jabir was a central figure in Kufan Ghulat circles, while Lalani writes that it is difficult to ascertain whether Jabir was really the transmitter of the traditions in Umm al-Kitab or if some or many were later foisted upon him. Resembling the Infancy Gospel of Thomas, the book illustrates the similarity between imamology and gnostic Christology. A major concept of this work is the description of the numinous experience. Its central motif is the psychological and philosophical explanation of spiritual symbols, with believers instructed to perform acts of self-purification and renewal. Colours are used to symbolise theories and levels of consciousness that one must recognize in oneself.

Views

Sunni view
The reputation of al-Baqir as a traditionalist and religious scholar went far beyond the Shia circles. Al-Baqir is the authority of over a hundred traditions in the six canonical collections of Sunni hadith. In Sunni works, al-Baqir is depicted as an eminent theologian,  (expert in jurisprudence), and interpreter of the Quran. He is occasionally criticised though for directly quoting individuals who died before he was born or when he was still an infant. Al-Baqir is cited by Ibn Ishaq in his prophetic biography and by al-Tabari for a version of the events in Karbala. In Sunni sources, al-Baqir is portrayed as a proto-Sunni scholar who rejected what his Shia followers attributed to him. For instance, in contrast with Shia sources, later Sunni authors maintain that al-Baqir supported Abu Bakr and Umar, called them Imams, and said that one should pray behind the Umayyads. 

The Sunni attitude towards al-Baqir is reflected in the following statements. Abd Allah ibn Ata al-Makki conceded that he had never seen scholars feel so small in the presence of anyone as they felt before al-Baqir. He added that even the famous traditionalist, al-Hakam ibn Utayba, despite his age and eminence, behaved before al-Baqir as so he was a pupil before a teacher. Muhammad ibn al-Munkadir is reported to have said that he had not seen anyone who surpassed Ali ibn al-Husayn, until he met his son, Muhammad al-Baqir. While Shia sources describe a meeting between al-Baqir and Abu Hanifa in a negative light, Sunni sources write that Abu Hanifa was a prominent disciple of al-Baqir, who had prophesied that Abu Hanifa would revive the prophet's .

Isma'ili view
Al-Baqir is Ismaiilie's fourth Imam and an authority in Ismaili law.

Zaydi view
Al-Baqir is not recognized by Zaydis as an Imam, though he is seen as a prominent figure and his traditions appear in some Zaydi works such as Amali al-Imam Aḥmad ibn Isa. According to Kohlberg, al-Baqir is portrayed in Zaydi works as acknowledging Zayd's superior knowledge and so, by implication, Zayd's claims to the imamate."

Sufi view
Al-Baqir is a well-known figure among the Sufi, frequently depicted in their biographies as a distinguished authority in the intricacies of the (esoteric) sciences and the subtle allusions of the Quran. He is also said to have performed well-known miracles, and displayed radiant signs and distinct proofs of God. In Sufi sources, al-Baqir reached the spiritual stations of the gnostics. It is related that al-Baqir defined Sufism as "goodness of disposition: he that has the better disposition is the better Sufi."

See also 

 Family tree of Muhammad
 Ali ibn Husayn Zayn al-Abidin
 Jafar al-Sadiq
 Jabir ibn Abd Allah
 Zayd ibn Ali
 Zaydism
 Mashhad Ardehal

Footnotes

References

Sources 
 
 
 
 
 
 
 
 
 
 
 
 
 
 

 

677 births
733 deaths
7th-century Arabs
8th-century Arabs
8th-century imams
Twelve Imams
Deaths by poisoning
Husaynids
Burials at Jannat al-Baqī